The women's high jump competition at the 2011 Pan American Games in Guadalajara was held on October 24 at the newly built Telmex Athletics Stadium.  The defending Pan American Games champion is Romary Rifka of the Mexico.

Records
Prior to this competition, the existing world and Pan American Games records were as follows:

Qualification
Each National Olympic Committee (NOC) was able to enter up to two entrants providing they had met the minimum standard (1.76) in the qualifying period (January 1, 2010 to September 14, 2011).

Schedule

Results

All distances shown are in meters:centimeters

Final
The final was held on October 26.

References

Athletics at the 2011 Pan American Games
2011
2011 in women's athletics